Michael Feuer may refer to:

 Mike Feuer (born 1958), American politician and lawyer
 Michael J. Feuer, American educator, professor and writer